was a village located in Kamiminochi District, Nagano Prefecture, Japan.

In 2003, the village had an estimated population of 7,442 and a density of 186.75 persons per km2. The total area was 39.85 km2.

On October 1, 2005, Mure was merged with the village of Samizu (also from Kamiminochi District) to create the town of Iizuna.

Dissolved municipalities of Nagano Prefecture
Iizuna, Nagano